Lenah H. Sutcliffe Higbee (May 18, 1874 – January 10, 1941) was a pioneering Canadian-born United States Navy military nurse, who served as Superintendent of the U.S. Navy Nurse Corps during World War I. She is best known for being the first female recipient of the Navy Cross.

Early life and education
Higbee was born Lenah H. Sutcliffe in Chatham, New Brunswick, Canada, on 18 May 1874.  She completed nurses' training at the New York Post-Graduate Hospital in 1899 and entered private practice soon thereafter. Lenah Higbee took postgraduate training at Fordham Hospital, New York in 1908.

In 1899, she married retired Marine Corps Lieutenant Colonel John H. Higbee. His first wife Isabel Higbee had died in 1898. John Higbee had served as a Marine Corps officer from 1861 to 1898. He died in April 1908 and was interred at Arlington National Cemetery.

Career 
In October 1908, she joined the newly established U.S. Navy Nurse Corps as one of its first twenty members. These nurses, who came to be called "The Sacred Twenty", were the first women to formally serve as members of the Navy. The Navy required its first Nurse Corps candidates to be between 22 and 44 years old and also unmarried. As a 34-year-old widow, Higbee met these requirements.

She was promoted to Chief Nurse in 1909. Lenah Higbee became Chief Nurse at Norfolk Naval Hospital in April 1909.

In January 1911, Higbee became the second Superintendent of the U.S. Navy Nurse Corps. For her achievements in leading the Corps through the First World War, Chief Nurse Higbee was the first woman awarded the Navy Cross. Navy nurses Marie Louise Hidell, Lillian M. Murphy and Edna E. Place were also awarded the Navy Cross in 1920 for their World War I service, but these women all received the award posthumously after having succumbed to the Spanish flu, which they contracted while caring for hospital patients.

Navy Cross citation

Later life and death
She resigned from the position of Superintendent and retired from the Navy on 23 November 1922.

Higbee died at Winter Park, Florida, on 10 January 1941 and is buried at Arlington National Cemetery, in Arlington, Virginia.

Legacy
The US Navy has named two ships in her honor;
 , a  commissioned in 1945, as the first U.S. Navy warship to bear the name of one of its female members.
 , a planned  guided missile destroyer scheduled to enter the fleet in 2024.

References

Further reading

External links

 Photos of Lenah Higbee
 Nurses and the U.S. Navy  –Overview and Special Image Selection Naval Historical Center
 Lenah Sutcliffe Higbee Naval History and Heritage Command
 

1874 births
1941 deaths
Canadian emigrants to the United States
Female United States Navy officers
United States Navy Nurse Corps officers
American nursing administrators
United States Navy personnel of World War I
American women in World War I
Female nurses in World War I
Recipients of the Navy Cross (United States)
Burials at Arlington National Cemetery